Hog Island may refer to:

Australia
 Hog Island (Tasmania)

Bahamas
 Former name of Paradise Island

Canada
 Hog Island (North Channel) in the North Channel
 Hog Island (Ottawa River) in the Ottawa River
 Hog Island (Prince Edward Island), located off the northwest coast of Prince Edward Island

Falkland Islands
 Hog Island, Falkland Islands

Guyana
 Hogg Island, Guyana

Honduras
 Cayos Cochinos, are sometimes referred to in English as the Hog Islands

India
 Hog Island, Mumbai

Indonesia
 Simeulue, historically known to European mariners as Hog Island

United States

 Hog Island (Aleutian Islands), Alaska
 Hog Island (Kodiak Archipelago), Alaska

 Hog Island (Petaluma River), California
 Hog Island (Tomales Bay), California
 Hog Island (San Joaquin County), California

 Honeymoon Island, in Florida along the Gulf Coast formerly known as Hog Island
 Appledore Island, Maine, formerly known as Hog Island
 Hog Island (Lincoln County, Maine), off Bremen
 Hog Island (Calvert County), Chesapeake Bay, an island of Maryland
 Hog Island (Dorchester County), an island of Maryland
 Hog Island (Prospect Bay), an island of Maryland
 Hog Island (Worcester County, Maryland), an island of Maryland
 Spinnaker Island (Massachusetts), formerly known as Hog Island
 Hog Island (Michigan)
 Hog Island (Mohawk River), island in New York state also known as Isle of the Cayugas
 Hog Island (New York), two islands by this name near the Rockaways
 Translation of the Dutch name Varkens Eylandt, an old name for Roosevelt Island
 Hog Island (Oregon)
 Hog Island, Philadelphia, Pennsylvania
 Hog Island (Rhode Island)
 Hog Island (Virginia)
 Hog Island (Potomac), Virginia, an island of the Potomac River
 Hog Island (Wisconsin)

See also
 Hog Islander
 Hog Island sheep, a breed of sheep descended from animals first brought to Virginia's Hog Island in the 18th century